John William Kyle (August 21, 1891 – 1965) was an American politician and judge from Mississippi who served on the Supreme Court of Mississippi from 1950 until his death in 1965.

Kyle was born in Batesville, Mississippi, as the oldest of eight children, to Mary Francis  Heflin and Albert Sidney Kyle.

He was a Rhodes Scholar and served multiple terms as a state senator for the district including Sardis (which, in the previous century, John C. Kyle had also represented in the senate).

After serving as state attorney general, he was appointed in 1950 a commissioner (judge) of the state supreme court, running unopposed in the subsequent special election, and in the elections of 1952 and 1960, serving until 1965.

John W. Kyle State Park, in Mississippi, is named after him.

References

External links
 

Justices of the Mississippi Supreme Court
American Rhodes Scholars
Mississippi state senators
1891 births
1965 deaths
20th-century American judges
People from Batesville, Mississippi
20th-century American politicians